Linda Indergand (born 13 July 1993) is a Swiss racing cyclist. She rode at the 2014 UCI Road World Championships. She was on the start list of the 2018 Cross Country European Championships and finished in tenth place. On 27 July 2021, she won a bronze medal at the 2020 Summer Olympics in Tokyo. Her teammates, Jolanda Neff and Sina Frei, won the gold and silver medals, marking the first time there had been a Swiss podium at the Olympics since 1936 and the first time a nation won all three medals in a cycling event since 1904.

References

External links
 

1993 births
Living people
Swiss female cyclists
Place of birth missing (living people)
Cyclists at the 2010 Summer Youth Olympics
Cross-country mountain bikers
Cyclists at the 2015 European Games
European Games competitors for Switzerland
Olympic cyclists of Switzerland
Cyclists at the 2016 Summer Olympics
Cyclists at the 2020 Summer Olympics
Medalists at the 2020 Summer Olympics
Olympic medalists in cycling
Olympic bronze medalists for Switzerland
People from the canton of Uri
21st-century Swiss women